Lamplight Analytics is a social media analytics company headquartered in Hong Kong. The company provides a software-as-a-service (SaaS) social media platform called Lamplight that allows users to capture and aggregate data from social media, blogs, boards, forums and other media online.

History 
Lamplight Analytics was launched in November 2014. Lamplight further interprets social media data using proprietary technology, algorithms, machine learning and natural language processing so businesses and individuals can understand the world's social media data. The tool offers data visualisation, sentiment analysis, influencer identification and geolocation, among other features that help users uncover important insights through social media data quickly and easily.

The company's current management includes Fergus Clarke, former Head of Research in North Asia for Edelman Intelligence, the research, analytics and measurement division of Edelman and Nathan Pacey, former Technical Architect at SAI Global and Head of IT and Risk at Arnott Capital, where he worked on high-frequency trading platforms, data warehousing strategy and implementation.

Business Model 
Lamplight Analytics primarily offers a freemium SaaS product (called Lamplight) to its users. The company also provides a suite of added enterprise-level services including reporting, data & platform integration, influencer identification, customization and consulting services.

Funding 
In September 2015, Lamplight Analytics raised US$1.5 million in seed funding with the round led by Vectr Ventures.

Reputation

Awards 
In 2015, the company won at the Silicon Dragon Awards as the top startup representing Hong Kong in Asia. In 2016, Lamplight Analytics was also awarded a top Hong Kong startup award by the Hong Kong Venture Capital Association (HKVCA) at their third annual venture capital forum.

Lamplight Analytics was also shortlisted for Campaign Asia's Innovate Awards as one of the Top 12 startups to consider for brand marketing and advertising in the Asia-Pacific region and noted as a promising startup by the Harvard Business School Association of Hong Kong (HBSAHK).

Media 
Lamplight Analytics is frequently cited by media, including Forbes, the South China Morning Post, VentureBeat, and The Hollywood Reporter, for its relevant insights and research on Asia-specific trends and industries.

Clients 
Companies of all sizes and industries use Lamplight, including MNCs such as KPMG, Lane Crawford, Live Nation Entertainment, SMEs companies, NGOs, startups and independent brands.

References 

American companies established in 2014
Social media companies
Social media management platforms
Analytics companies